I Am Curious Partridge may refer to:

 "I Am Curious Partridge", a song from Action Pants! by Bunnygrunt
 "I Am Curious... Partridge", an episode of The Partridge Family

See also
 I Am Curious (disambiguation)